Alessandro Durini, 6th Earl of Monza (1818-1892) was an Italian noble and painter active in his native Milan, mainly painting in watercolor, depicting historical and genre subjects.

Biography
Born to an aristocratic family from Milano which are the Counts of Monza, a still extant cultural foundation is named after him. He trained under Luigi Sabatelli at the Brera Academy.

References

1818 births
1892 deaths
19th-century Italian painters
Italian male painters
Painters from Milan
Italian genre painters
Brera Academy alumni
19th-century Italian male artists